Wartburgkreis II – Eisenach is an electoral constituency (German: Wahlkreis) represented in the Landtag of Thuringia. It elects one member via first-past-the-post voting. Under the current constituency numbering system, it is designated as constituency 6. It covers the city of Eisenach and central-western parts of Wartburgkreis.

Wartburgkreis II – Eisenach was created for the 1994 state election. Since 2014, it has been represented by Raymond Walk of the Christian Democratic Union (CDU).

Geography
As of the 2019 state election, Wartburgkreis II – Eisenach contains the urban district of Eisenach and central-western parts of Wartburgkreis, specifically the municipalities of Bad Salzungen (excluding Ettenhausen an der Suhl), Gerstungen, and Werra-Suhl-Tal.

Members
The constituency was held by the Christian Democratic Union from its creation in 1994 until 2009, during which time it was represented by Christian Köckert. It was won by The Left in 2009, and represented by Katja Wolf. The seat was regained by the CDU in 2014, and represented by Raymond Walk. He was re-elected in 2019.

Election results

2019 election

2014 election

2009 election

2004 election

1999 election

1994 election

References

Electoral districts in Thuringia
1994 establishments in Germany
Wartburgkreis
Eisenach
Constituencies established in 1994